Pseudoromicia is a genus of vesper bat in the family Vespertilionidae. All species in this genus are native to sub-Saharan Africa.

It contains the following species:

 Dark-brown serotine, Pseudoromicia brunnea
 Isabelline serotine, Pseudoromicia isabella
 Kityo's serotine, Pseudoromicia kityoi
 Mbam Minkom Serotine, Pseudoromicia mbamminkom
 Nyanza serotine, Pseudoromicia nyanza
 Rendall's serotine, Pseudoromicia rendalli
 Rosevear's serotine, Pseudoromicia roseveari
 White-winged serotine, Pseudoromicia tenuipinnis

All species in this genus were previously classified in the genus Neoromicia until a 2020 study found them to form a distinct genus sister to Afronycteris, and they were thus reclassified in the new genus Pseudoromicia.

References 

Pseudoromicia
Bat genera